Mihai Ivăncescu (22 March 1942 – 2 January 2004) was a Romanian footballer who played as a right back for two Brașov teams, Steagul and Tractorul.

Club career
Mihai Ivăncescu was born on 22 March 1942 in Adâncata, Romania. He started to play football at junior level in 1956, aged 14 at Steagul Roșu Brașov. He made his Divizia A debut, playing for Steagul on 24 September 1961 under coach Silviu Ploeșteanu in a 2–1 home victory against Dinamo București. After one season and a half he went to play at neighboring Brașov team, Tractorul in Divizia B. He returned at Steagul in 1964, where he would remain for the following nine seasons, the highlights of this period being a fourth place in the 1964–65 Divizia A season and four games played in the 1965–66 Inter-Cities Fairs Cup as the club eliminated NK Zagreb, but got eliminated in the following round by Espanyol Barcelona against whom he scored two goals, also at end of the 1967–68 Divizia A season, the club relegated to Divizia B, but Ivăncescu stayed with the club, promoting back to the first division after one year. He played his last Divizia A match on 28 April 1973 in a 1–0 home loss against Dinamo, a competition in which he has a total of 209 appearances with 13 goals scored, afterwards returning to play in Divizia B for the last two seasons of his career at Tractorul Brașov and on 6 April 1976 on the Tractorul stadium he had his retirement match, playing the first round for Tractorul and the second for Steagul. After he retired, he became a football referee, including arbitrating matches in the Romanian top-division, Divizia A. Mihai Ivăncescu died on 1 February 2004 at age 61 at the Brașov county hospital.

International career
Mihai Ivăncescu played three friendly games at international level for Romania, all of them being draws and all under the guidance of coach Angelo Niculescu, making his debut on 24 December 1967 in a 1–1 against DR Congo, his following two games being a 1–1 against Austria and a 0–0 against Netherlands. He was a member of Steagul Roșu Brașov's "Mexican trio", alongside Stere Adamache and Nicolae Pescaru who were part of Romania's 1970 Mexico World Cup squad, but he did not play in the tournament.

Honours
	Steagul Roșu Brașov	
Divizia B: 1968–69

Notes

References

External links
Mihai Ivăncescu at Labtof.ro

1942 births
2004 deaths
Romanian footballers
Romania international footballers
Association football defenders
1970 FIFA World Cup players
FC Brașov (1936) players
Liga I players
Liga II players
Romanian football referees